The 2021–22 Columbus Blue Jackets season was the 22nd season for the National Hockey League franchise that was established on June 25, 1997. On April 16, 2022, the Blue Jackets were eliminated from playoff contention when the Washington Capitals defeated the Montreal Canadiens.

Standings

Divisional standings

Conference standings

Schedule and results

Preseason

Regular season

Player statistics
As of March 22, 2022

Skaters

Goaltenders

†Denotes player spent time with another team before joining the Blue Jackets. Stats reflect time with the Blue Jackets only.
‡Denotes player was traded mid-season. Stats reflect time with the Blue Jackets only.
Bold/italics denotes franchise record.

Transactions
The Blue Jackets have been involved in the following transactions during the 2021–22 season.

Key:

 Contract is entry-level.

 Contract initially takes effect in the 2022-23 NHL season.

Trades

Notes:
 Columbus would receive Chicago's 1st-round pick in 2022 if the pick was outside the top 2, otherwise Columbus would receive Chicago's 1st-round pick in 2023. As Chicago's pick was outside the top 2 selections, Columbus received Chicago's 2022 1st-round pick.

Players acquired

Players lost

Signings

Draft picks

Below are the Columbus Blue Jackets' selections at the 2021 NHL Entry Draft, which were held on July 23 to 24, 2021. It was held virtually via Video conference call from the NHL Network studio in Secaucus, New Jersey.

References

Columbus Blue Jackets

Columbus Blue Jackets seasons
Blue
Blue